Holmium phosphide is a binary inorganic compound of holmium and phosphorus with the chemical formula HoP. The compound forms dark crystals and does not dissolve in water.

Synthesis
Heating powdered holmium and red phosphorus in an inert atmosphere or vacuum:
 4Ho + P4 -> 4HoP

Properties
Holmium phosphide forms dark crystals of a cubic system, stable in air, does not dissolve in water.

HoP belongs to the large class of NaCl-structured rare earth monopnictides.

Ferromagnetic at low temperatures.

HoP actively reacts with nitric acid.

Uses
The compound is a semiconductor used in high power, high frequency applications and in laser diodes.

References

Phosphides
Holmium compounds
Semiconductors
Rock salt crystal structure